Lernmatrix, an associative-memory-like architecture of an artificial neural network, invented around 1960 by Karl Steinbuch.

External links 
A new theoretical framework for the Steinbuch's Lernmatrix
Pattern recognition and classification using weightless neural networks (WNN) and Steinbuch Lernmatrix
DARPA project will study neural network processes

Artificial neural networks